Shirley Stops the Shows is the seventh Shirley Bassey studio album, her 5th and final studio album recorded for the EMI/Columbia label in the UK. Released in 1965, this album is a mix of standards and showtunes. Shirley Bassey was at a high point in her career, with worldwide success of her single "Goldfinger", but the album failed to chart in the UK, a first for her Columbia albums. The album met with more success in the US, reaching number 85 in the US Pop charts. For the US market it was issued with an alternative running order, retitled Shirley Bassey Belts the Best! and "The Lady Is a Tramp" was replaced by "Goldfinger". Original release was in mono and stereo, both mono versions feature an alternative studio recording of "People" which has not yet been re-issued on CD. 
The stereo version, remastered, was issued on CD in 2008 together with 12 of Those Songs by BGO Records.

Track listing
Side One.
"Everything's Coming up Roses" (Jule Styne, Stephen Sondheim) – 3.22
"The Sweetest Sounds" (Richard Rodgers) – 2.38
"He Loves Me" (Jerry Bock, Sheldon Harnick) – 2.04
"I Believe in You" (Frank Loesser) – 2.13
"People" (Jule Styne, Bob Merrill) – 2.47
"The Lady is a Tramp" (Richard Rodgers, Lorenz Hart) – 2.55

Side Two.
"Once in a Lifetime" (Anthony Newley, Leslie Bricusse) – 2.20
"Something Wonderful" (Richard Rodgers, Oscar Hammerstein II) – 2.42
"A Lot of Livin' to Do" (Charles Strouse, Lee Adams) – 1.54
"If Ever I Would Leave You" (Alan Jay Lerner, Frederick Loewe) – 2.43
"Somewhere" (Stephen Sondheim, Leonard Bernstein) – 2.49
"I Could Have Danced All Night" (Lerner, Loewe) – 1.54

Personnel
 Shirley Bassey – vocal
 Johnny Scott and his Orchestra – on track 4 and 10
 Tony Osborne and his Orchestra – on track 11
 Kenny Clayton and his Orchestra – on track 12
 Johnnie Spence and his Orchestra – on tracks all other tracks

References

1965 albums
Shirley Bassey albums
EMI Records albums
Columbia Records albums
Albums produced by Norman Newell